State Highway 11 (West Bengal) is a state highway in West Bengal, India.

Route
SH 11 originates from  Mohammad Bazar and passes through Sainthia, Kotasur, Kandi, Gokarna, Baharampur, Muktinagar, Daulatabad, Chhay Ghari, Islampur, Domkal, Sadikhanr Diar, Jalangi, Karimpur, Mahish Bathan, Betai, Tehatta, Chapra, Krishnanagar, Badkulla and Birnagar, before terminating at Ranaghat.

The total length of SH 11 is 251 km.

Districts traversed by SH 11 are:
Birbhum district (0 – 31.7 km)Murshidabad district (31.7 – 139.7 km)Nadia district (139.7 – 258.32 km)

Road sections
It is divided into different sections as follows:.

See also
List of state highways in West Bengal

References

State Highways in West Bengal
Transport in Birbhum district